The Ascension of the Elect is a c. 1470 oil on panel painting by the Early Netherlandish painter Dieric Bouts, originally produced as part of a triptych of the Last Judgment commissioned by the town of Louvain in 1468. The central panel is lost but the other side panel, The Fall of the Damned, survives. Concerning the Elect in the end times, the painting draws on Genesis 2:10, Book of Revelation and The Purgatory of St Patrick, a 14th-century Irish manuscript by Berol telling of Sir Owein's legendary trip to Purgatory. Ascension is now in the  palais des Beaux-Arts de Lille.

References

Paintings by Dieric Bouts
1470s paintings
Paintings based on the Book of Revelation
Paintings in the collection of the Palais des Beaux-Arts de Lille